Sylhet-2 is a constituency represented in the Jatiya Sangsad (National Parliament) of Bangladesh since 2019 by Mokabbir Khan of the Gano Forum.

Boundaries 
The constituency encompasses Bishwanath and Osmani Nagar upazilas.

History 
The constituency was created for the first general elections in newly independent Bangladesh, held in 1973.

Ahead of the 2008 general election, the Election Commission redrew constituency boundaries to reflect population changes revealed by the 2001 Bangladesh census. The 2008 redistricting altered the boundaries of the constituency.

Ahead of the 2018 general election, the Election Commission altered the boundaries of the constituency. Previously it included three union parishads of Balaganj Upazila: Dewan Bazar, Paschim Gauripur, and Purba Gauripur, but did not include Osmani Nagar Upazila.

Members of Parliament

Elections

Elections in the 2010s

Elections in the 2000s

Elections in the 1990s

References

External links
 

Parliamentary constituencies in Bangladesh
Sylhet District
Bishwanath Upazila
Osmani Nagar Upazila